Scilla Sclanizza (1926 – 2006) was an Italian screen and stage actress, who later dedicated her life to educational theatre and puppeteering.

Biography 
She was named after her birthplace, Scilla in Calabria, south Italy, though her father Umberto Sclanizza, an actor hailing from Friuli, brought her up in the north. Her early film roles were usually in films that her actor father was appearing in, such as 'Sei bambine ed il Perseo' ('Perseus and the six children') (1940). Scilla Sclanizza married the prominent Italian puppeteer Otello Sarzi (1922–2001). Their son, Mauro Sarzi (born 1947) is also a prolific theatre artist, continuing the puppeteering tradition going back five generations. Her second marriage was to Mario Verdirosi, also an actor and puppeteer. Scilla Sclanizza died in Turin, Italy in 2006.

External links
 https://www.imdb.com/name/nm1426010/
 https://web.archive.org/web/20070222021605/http://www.fondazionesarzi.it/en/famigliasarzi.html
 https://web.archive.org/web/20070928103651/http://www.fondazionesarzi.it/en/membri/otellosarzi.html

References

Italian actresses
2006 deaths
People from Scilla, Calabria
1926 births